Events from the year 1810 in Russia

Incumbents
 Monarch – Alexander I

Events

 The Saint Petersburg main military engineering school becomes the first engineering higher learning institution in the Russian Empire, after the addition of officers' classes, and the application of a five-year term of teaching.
 Ministry of Police of the Russian Empire
 Council of Ministers of Russia
 State Council (Russian Empire)

Births

Deaths

References

1810 in Russia
Years of the 19th century in the Russian Empire